Ece Tekmen (born 23 February 2002) is a Turkish women's football midfielder, who plays for ALG Spor and the Turkey women's national football team.

Club career 
Tekmen started her football career at the Second League women's football club Harb-İş Spor in Kocaeli.

Ahe played for the Kocaeli Bayan FK. In 2019, she suffered cruciate ligament rupture, which caused a stay off from the pitch for five months in the beginning of the 2019–20 Turkish Women's First Football League season. The team finished the 2018–19 Turkish Second Football League season as runner-up, and was promoted to the First League.

She transferred to ALG Spor in Gaziantep.< She enjoyed her team's third place in the 2020–21 Turkcell Women's Football League. She enjoyed the 2021–22 Women's Super League champion title of her team. On 18 August 2022, she debuted in the 2022–23 UEFA Women's Champions League.

International career 
Turkey girls' U17
She was called up to the training camp of the national girls'U17 team. She internationally debuted in the friendly match  against Russia on 25 January 2017. She took part in five matches of the UEFA Women's U17 Development Tournament in 2017, scoring a goal against Latvia. She played at the 2018 UEFA U17 Championship qualification – Group 7  and Elite round – Group 6 matches. She netted two goals in the friendly game against North Ireland on 6 February 2018. She participated at the 29018 UEFA Women's U16 Development Tournament, and the 2019 UEFA U7 Championship qualification – Group 6 matches. She capped 29 timesin total for the Turkey girls' U17 team.

Turkey women's U19
On 10 September 2019, Tekmen played her only match for the Turkey women's U19 team.

Turkey women's
By October 2020, she was called up to the Turkey women's national football team. She played for the national team in July and September 2021.

Career statistics

Honours

Club 
 Turkish Women's Second League
Kocaeli Bayan FK
Runner-ups (1): 2018–19

Turkish Women's First League
ALG Spor
 Winners (1): 2021–22
Third places (1): 2020–21

Individual
 Top goalscorer
 Turkish Women's Second League with Kocaeli Bayan FK (33 goals)

References 

2002 births
Living people
Sportspeople from İzmit
Turkish women's footballers
Women's association football midfielders
Turkey women's international footballers
Kocaeli Bayan FK players
ALG Spor players
Turkish Women's Football Super League players